Sweden competed at the 2022 Winter Paralympics in Beijing, China, which was held between the 4th and 13th of March 2022.

Medalists

The following Swedish competitors won medals at the games. In the discipline sections below, the medalists' names are bolded.

| width="56%" align="left" valign="top" |

| width="22%" align="left" valign="top" |

Competitors 
The following is the list of number of competitors participating at the Games per sport.

Alpine skiing 

Sweden competed in alpine skiing.

Men

Biathlon 

Sweden competed in biathlon.

Men

Cross-country skiing

Arnt-Christian Furuberg was also qualified and selected to participate, but had to withdraw due to being infected with Covid-19. One cross-country skier represented Sweden.

Men's distance

Sprint

Wheelchair curling

Sweden qualified a team in wheelchair curling by winning bronze at the 2020 world championships and silver at the 2021 world championships.

Summary

Round robin

Draw 1
Saturday, March 5, 14:35

Draw 3
Sunday, March 6, 9:35

Draw 7
Monday, March 7, 14:35

Draw 8
Monday, March 7, 19:35

Draw 10
Tuesday, March 8, 14:35

Draw 11
Tuesday, March 8, 19:35

Draw 12
Wednesday, March 9, 9:35

Draw 13
Wednesday, March 9, 14:35

Draw 15
Thursday, March 10, 9:35

Draw 17
Thursday, March 10, 19:35

Semifinal
Friday, March 11, 14:35

Final

See also
 Sweden at the Paralympics
 Sweden at the 2022 Winter Olympics

Notes

References

Nations at the 2022 Winter Paralympics
2022
2022 in Swedish sport